Anthony "Tony" Willis (born 17 June 1960 in Liverpool, England) is a Former British boxing champion winning the Lonsdale Belt  out right and won a Light Welterweight Bronze medal at the 1980 Summer Olympics. As a professional, he held the British lightweight boxing title between 1985 and 1987.

1980 Olympic results 
Representing Great Britain, Willis was a bronze medalist in the Light Welterweight (63.5 kg) class at the 1980 Olympic Games in Moscow. His results were:
 Round of 32: Defeated Jaime Franco (Brazil) on points, 5-0
 Round of 16: Defeated Shadrach Odhiambo (Sweden) on points, 5-0
 Quarterfinal: Defeated William Lyimo (Tanzania) by third-round knockout
 Semifinal: Lost to Patrizio Oliva (Italy) on points, 0-5 (was awarded bronze medal)

Amateur titles 
1980 Amateur Boxing Association British light-welterweight champion
1981 A.B.A. Light welterweight champion

Pro career
Willis had his first professional fight in September 1981, beating Winston McKenzie. He won his first thirteen fights putting himself in line for a British lightweight title fight. In December 1983 he fought George Feeney for his British lightweight title. He lost when the fight was stopped in the first round.

In May 1985 he fought for the vacant British lightweight title against Ian McLeod, winning on points over twelve rounds. In November 1985 he defended his British title against Paul Chance. Willis won when the fight was stopped in the fifth round, Chance having been knocked down three times. In May 1986 he defended his title against Steve Boyle in Manchester, winning by a technical knockout in the ninth round.

In September 1987 he defended his title for the third time, against Scottish boxer, Alex Dickson. The fight was held in Glasgow, and Dickson won on points over twelve rounds to take Willis's title. After losing his title, Willis continued fighting but retired in May 1989 after being knocked out in a light-welterweight fight by Pat Barrett.

See also
 List of British lightweight boxing champions

References

External links
 

1960 births
Living people
English male boxers
Light-welterweight boxers
Lightweight boxers
Boxers at the 1980 Summer Olympics
Olympic boxers of Great Britain
Olympic bronze medallists for Great Britain
Boxers from Liverpool
Olympic medalists in boxing
Medalists at the 1980 Summer Olympics